The Tsung-Yeh Arts and Cultural Center is an arts and cultural center in Madou District, Tainan, Taiwan.

History
The center was opened in 2001 by transforming a former sugar refinery.

Architecture
The center consists of several buildings which are used as art workshops. It also features tunnel and grass field.

Transportation
The center is accessible by bus from Longtian Station of Taiwan Railways.

See also
 List of tourist attractions in Taiwan

References

External links

  

2001 establishments in Taiwan
Art centers in Tainan
Cultural centers in Tainan
Event venues established in 2001